Magbema is a chiefdom in Kambia District of Sierra Leone with a population of 67,211. Its principal town is Kambia.

References

Chiefdoms of Sierra Leone
Northern Province, Sierra Leone